Jeffrey Allan Anderson (born April 21, 1970) is an American film and television actor, director, and screenwriter best known for starring as Randal Graves in Clerks, Clerks II, and Clerks III. In between, he has appeared in other Kevin Smith-directed films and has written, directed, and starred in Now You Know.

Early life
Born in Connecticut and raised in Atlantic Highlands, New Jersey, Anderson attended Henry Hudson Regional High School, with his friend, aspiring writer Kevin Smith; they graduated in 1988.

While Anderson was working at AT&T, Smith was working on his debut movie Clerks. As a joke, Anderson auditioned for the role of "Jay," and based on this audition, Smith later offered Anderson a lead role as video store employee Randal Graves, a foul-mouthed apathetic slacker, who patronized, angered, and mocked his customers while avoiding any real work opportunities.

Career
For his role in Clerks, Anderson was nominated for an Independent Spirit Award for Best Debut Performance.

In 2002, Anderson wrote, directed, and starred in Now You Know. The writing process lasted only three months. Anderson received a nomination for Best Male Performance at the Chicago Film Festival for his role in Love 101, and has been seen in Peter Bergstrom's Something Cool. Anderson also started his own production company in Hollywood. In 2006, Anderson reprised his role as Randal in Clerks II.

In 2008, Anderson appeared in Kevin Smith's romantic comedy Zack and Miri Make a Porno as Deacon, the cameraman and film editor for the porno made by leading actors Seth Rogen and Elizabeth Banks.

On September 14, 2010, Anderson made his first appearance on Smith's SModcast filling in for Scott Mosier on SModcast #134. In his podcast, Anderson stated he had moved out of Los Angeles and into a "retirement community in the mountains" where he is "the youngest person there by 20 years." He also said he remarried in 2009, to an actress named Barbara Jacques he met while house sitting for Kevin Smith.

In April 2017, Anderson declined to reprise his role as Randal for Clerks III; the reasons have not been made public. An $8 million budget had been obtained, locations were being scouted in Philadelphia and a crew was being assembled, and the start of production was less than two months away. Due to Anderson's decision, production on the film was halted indefinitely, with Smith saying he would not recast the role. On October 1, 2019, Smith announced on Instagram that Clerks III was happening and that Anderson agreed to reprise his role as Randal. "It'll be a movie that concludes a saga. It'll be a movie about how you're never too old to completely change your life. It'll be a movie about how a decades-spanning friendship finally confronts the future. It'll be a movie that brings us back to the beginning — a return to the cradle of civilization in the great state of #newjersey. It'll be a movie that stars Jeff and Brian O'Halloran, with me and Jay in supporting roles. And it'll be a movie called CLERKS III!" Clerks III was released in 2022, completely rewritten from the 2017 version.

Filmography

Film

Television

Video games

References

External links
 
 

1970 births
Living people
Henry Hudson Regional High School alumni
Male actors from New Jersey
American male film actors
People from Atlantic Highlands, New Jersey
20th-century American male actors
21st-century American male actors
Film directors from New Jersey